Yevhen Herenda (born 11 April 1965) is a Ukrainian former football referee.

External links
 
 Yevhen Herenda referee profile at allplayers.in.ua

1965 births
Living people
People from Kalush, Ukraine
Ukrainian football referees
Sportspeople from Ivano-Frankivsk Oblast